Providence is an unincorporated community located in Trimble County, Kentucky, United States.

References

Unincorporated communities in Trimble County, Kentucky
Unincorporated communities in Kentucky